The Electricity Supply Industry Reform Unit (ESIRU) was established by the Victorian Government in 1994 within the Office of State Owned Enterprises in the Department of Treasury and Finance to advise the Government of Victoria (Australia) on the reform of Victoria's electricity industry in particular the State Electricity Commission of Victoria (SECV). ESIRU's tasks included a worldwide analysis of the Electricity Supply Industry (ESI) the development of a set of appropriate recommendations for electricity industry reform and project managing the implementation of the reforms. The director of ESIRU was Dr Peter Troughton.

Former government agencies of Victoria (Australia)
Energy in Victoria (Australia)